Neferu II was the wife and sister of the ancient Egyptian king Mentuhotep II who ruled in the 11th Dynasty, around 2000 BC.

Neferu is mainly known from her tomb (TT319) at Deir el-Bahari. The tomb was found badly destroyed but the decorated burial chamber was well preserved and many fragments from the reliefs in the tomb chapel were found. Her main titles were king's wife and king's daughter. The inscriptions in the tomb mention that she was the daughter of a person called Iah, most likely the king's mother Iah who was the mother of king Mentuhotep II. She was therefore his sister. It is known that Mentuhotep II was the son of king Intef III who was most likely the father of Neferu.

References

Literature 
Joyce Tyldesley: Chronicle of the Queens of Egypt. Thames & Hudson. 2006, p. 67.

Queens consort of the Eleventh Dynasty of Egypt
Mentuhotep II